Parish House may refer to:
Parish house, a church-related residence building
Church of the Good Shepherd and Parish House, Hartford, Connecticut
Parish House (Virginia City, Nevada), a former parish house of a St. Mary's church
All Souls Episcopal Church and Parish House, Asheville, North Carolina
Church of the Incarnation and Parish House, New York, New York